John McGrory (15 November 1941 – 12 October 2004) was a Scottish footballer who played for Kilmarnock for his whole senior career; this period included the 1964/65 season, when Killie won the Scottish league championship for the only time in their history. He also won six caps for the Scotland national football team. Three of these appearances were during a 1967 overseas tour that the Scottish Football Association decided in October 2021 to reclassify as full internationals, which increased McGrory's cap tally from three to six.

See also
List of one-club men

References

External links

1941 births
2004 deaths
Scottish footballers
Association football central defenders
Scotland international footballers
Scottish Football League players
Kilmarnock F.C. players
People from Renfrew
Footballers from Renfrewshire
Scottish Football League representative players
Scotland under-23 international footballers
Place of death missing